Gastón Turus (born May 27, 1980 in Colonia Caroya, Argentina) is a former Argentine footballer who played all of his career with Club Atlético Belgrano of the Primera División in Argentina.

Teams
  Belgrano de Córdoba 2000–2015

External links
  Profile at

1980 births
Living people
Argentine footballers
Argentine expatriate footballers
Club Atlético Belgrano footballers

Association footballers not categorized by position
21st-century Argentine people